Geissois is a genus of trees and shrubs in the plant family Cunoniaceae. It includes about 19 species mostly found in New Caledonia, but also in Fiji, Vanuatu, and the Solomon Islands. Leaves are opposite, palmate with 3-9 leaflets, with entire margin (serrate in Geissois hirsuta and juveniles) and intrapetiolar stipules. The inflorescences are simple racemes (trident in Geissois hirsuta) and bottle-brush like. The flowers have four red sepals, lacking petals, with many long red stamens. The fruit is a capsule, the seeds flat and winged. The genus includes several nickel hyperaccumulator (most species occurring on ultramafic rocks) and one aluminum hyperaccumulator, Geissois polyphylla.

Two species from Australia formerly placed in this genus have now been transferred to the genus Karrabina.

Species

New Caledonia 
 Geissois balansae 
 Geissois belema  
 Geissois bradfordii 
 Geissois hippocastanifolia 
 Geissois hirsuta 
 Geissois lanceolata 
 Geissois magnifica  
 Geissois montana 
 Geissois polyphylla 
 Geissois pruinosa 
 var. intermedia 
 var. pruinosa 
 Geissois racemosa 
 Geissois trifoliolata 
 Geissois velutina 

Fiji
 Geissois imthurnii 
 Geissois stipularis  
 Geissois superba 
 Geissois ternata 

Vanuatu
 Geissois denhamii 

Solomon Islands (Temotu Province)
 Geissois pentaphylla

References

 
Flora of New Caledonia
Flora of Vanuatu
Flora of Fiji
Oxalidales genera
Taxonomy articles created by Polbot